The Mount Marunga Mystery is a murder mystery first published in 1919 by Australian author Harrison Owen about the mysterious death of a fraudulent businessman in a rural Victorian township's five-star hotel. In June 2008, the novel was re-issued by Kessinger Publishing.

Adaptations
In 1921, Raymond Longford and Lottie Lyell adapted the novel into the silent film The Blue Mountains Mystery.

References

Resources
The Mount Marunga Mystery full text on archive.org

External links
 
The Mount Marunga Mystery at AustLit

1919 Australian novels
Australian mystery novels
Australian novels adapted into films
Novels set in Victoria (Australia)